Bangladesh – Sri Lanka relations refers to the bilateral relations between the People's Republic of Bangladesh and the Democratic Socialist Republic of Sri Lanka. Relations have been generally friendly due to trade and investments. Bangladesh also hosts a number of Sri Lankan medical students and cricket as a form of friendly communications between their people.

History
The two South Asian nations have been historically tied since before the sub-continent's colonisation by the British. Sri Lanka's first King, to be mentioned in the ancient Pali chronicles, was alleged to have ancestors from the Vanga Kingdom located in modern Bangladesh. In Sri Lanka, several strands of hair gifted by the Buddhists of Bangladesh, identified as originated from Buddha, are venerated on Poya Day, a Buddhist public holiday in Sri Lanka.

During the Bangladesh Liberation War, Sri Lanka saw the partition of Pakistan as an example for themselves and feared India might use its enhanced power against them in the future. Despite the left wing government of Sirimavo Bandaranaike following a neutral non-aligned foreign policy, Sri Lanka assisted Pakistan in the war. As Pakistani aircraft could not fly over Indian territory, they took a longer route around India and stopped at Bandaranaike Airport in Katunayake where they were refuelled before flying to East Pakistan.

In August 2008, both Heads of States discussed the implementation of new air links in hope of increasing trade, investment and stronger cultural links. Sri Lanka's current investments have been in Bangladesh's garment and banking sector and expect to diversify into different areas. Bangladesh also hosts a number of Sri Lankan medical students and cricket as a form of friendly communications between their people.

In 2015, Sri Lanka donates 30 ‘Samadhi Buddha Statues’ to reconstructed and renovated temples after 2012 Ramu violence.

Military
There has been discussion to increase bilateral relations, cooperation between the two navies and sending Sri Lankan Naval personnel to study in Bangladesh. Recently many Bangladesh Navy ships visited Sri Lanka for goodwill visits.

Economy
The Bangladesh-Sri Lanka joint working group was formed in 2013 to increase trade. The two countries have agreed to sign a shipping agreement. In 2013 Bilateral trade between the two countries crossed the 100 million dollar mark.

In 2021 Bangladesh has agreed to give Sri Lanka loans of at least $200 million from the foreign exchange reserves under a currency swap deal. Bangladesh becomes a lender for first time

See also
 Foreign relations of Bangladesh
 Foreign relations of Sri Lanka
 South Asian Association for Regional Cooperation (SAARC)

References

External links

 
Sri Lanka
Bilateral relations of Sri Lanka